Chiarella is an Italian surname. Notable people with the surname include:
Mary Chiarella, British-born Australian nursing educator
Tom Chiarella, American writer
Walter Chiarella (born 1963), Italian footballer and manager
Hugo Chiarella, Australian writer and director

See also
Chiarella v. United States, a United States Supreme Court case
Chiarella, a genus of hydrozoans in the family Bougainvilliidae

Italian-language surnames